Starcom Systems Inc. is a company based in Jersey, Channel Islands, specializing in wireless systems for remote tracking, monitoring and protection of a variety of assets. Among the company's products are tracking and security systems for vehicles, shipping containers, merchandise and people. Its two main products are the Helios system, used for location and monitoring of vehicles, and the award-winning Watchlock padlock, which also functions as a digital security system.

History
The company was founded in 2004, focusing on vehicle tracking for insurance purposes. In 2005, the company introduced a vehicle location and fleet management system which was a predecessor for its later flagship product, Helios. In 2005, the company has opened its regional sales office in Argentina, followed by an office Kenya in 2008. The Helios was released to the market in 2008, followed by other tracking systems for a variety of purposes in 2012.
In 2013, Starcom Systems raised £2.7 million on London's Alternative Investment Market. The company's total sales in 2013 amounted to $9 million. In 2014, the company announced that it has to defer the recognition of revenues on orders due to the effects the Crimea crisis has had on a distributor in Ukraine.

Products
Starcom Systems manufactures several systems for different tracking purposes, each designated for a specific kind of asset.
Helios - an automatic vehicle location and fleet management system.
Watchlock – a security padlock integrated with a monitoring system that provides both location information and periodical reports.
Tetis – a container tracking system based on wireless sensors within the container.
Kylos – a tracking device for merchandise and personal goods as baggage, with a built-in battery and no need for an external power supply.
Rainbow - a personal tracking device, designed for the remote monitoring of individuals at a certain level of risk – old people or young children.

Recognition
WatchLock has won the “Physical Security Product of the Year” award at the IFSEC International 2012, Security Industry Awards event.

References

External links
 Official website

Companies listed on the London Stock Exchange
Wireless locating
Tracking